The 1950 Tufts Jumbos baseball team represented the Tufts University in the 1950 NCAA baseball season. The team was coached by John Ricker in his 4th season at Tufts.

The Jumbos reached the College World Series, but were eliminated by the Texas Longhorns in the quarterfinals, where they were no-hit by Jim Ehrler.

Roster

Schedule

References

Tufts Jumbos baseball seasons
College World Series seasons
Tufts Jumbos
Tufts